Viktor Alexandrovich Hartmann (Russian: Ви́ктор Алекса́ндрович Га́ртман; 5 May 1834, Saint Petersburg – 4 August 1873, Kireyevo near Moscow) was a Russian architect and painter. He was associated with the Abramtsevo Colony, purchased and preserved beginning in 1870 by Savva Mamontov, and the Russian Revival.

Life
Victor-Edouard Hartmann was born in Saint Petersburg into a family of German ancestry. He was orphaned at a young age and grew up in the house of his mother's sister, L. Hemilian, and her husband Alexandre Hemilian, who was a well-known architect. He studied at the Academy of Fine Arts in Saint Petersburg and at first started working by illustrating books.

He also worked as an architect and sketched, among other things, the monument to the thousandth anniversary of Russia in Novgorod, which was inaugurated in 1862. He made most of his water colors and pencil drawings on journeys abroad in the years 1864 to 1868. Together with Ivan Ropet, Hartmann was one of the first artists to include traditional Russian motifs in his work.

Since Vladimir Stasov had introduced him to the circle of Mily Balakirev in 1870, he had been a close friend of the composer Modest Mussorgsky. Following Hartmann's early death from an aneurysm at the age of only 39, an exhibition of over 400 of his paintings was displayed in the Academy of Fine Arts in Saint Petersburg, in February and March 1874. This inspired Mussorgsky to compose his suite Pictures at an Exhibition. Most of the works shown at the 1874 exhibition are now lost.

Gallery

See also

 List of Russian artists

External links
Reproductions of Viktor Hartmann's pictures
  More reproductions of Viktor Hartmann's pictures

1834 births
1873 deaths
Architects from Saint Petersburg
People from Sankt-Peterburgsky Uyezd
Russian people of German descent
Architects from the Russian Empire
19th-century painters from the Russian Empire
Russian male painters
19th-century sculptors from the Russian Empire
19th-century male artists from the Russian Empire
Russian male sculptors
Russian Revival architecture
19th-century architects from the Russian Empire
Deaths from aneurysm
Artists from Saint Petersburg